Galterud is a small village in Hedmark county, Norway. Its territory is located partly in Sør-Odal municipal, and partly in the former municipality of Vinger, now a part of Kongsvinger.

It has a station on the Kongsvingerbanen railway.

Arons Hule (eng. Arons Cave) is a tourist attraction not far from Galterud.

References

Populated places in Hedmark